A riff is an example of ostinato, a short, repeated musical phrase.

Riff, RIFF, The 'Riff, or Riffs may also refer to:

Acronyms
 Rajasthan International Folk Festival
 Resource Interchange File Format
 Reykjavík International Film Festival
 Riverside International Film Festival
 Rome Independent Film Festival

Fictional characters
 Riff (dinosaur), on Barney & Friends, a supporting character from 2006 to 2018.
 Riff, a character in Allegra’s Window
 Riff (Sluggy Freelance)
 Riff, the leader of the Jets in West Side Story
 Riff Randle, protagonist of the Ramones film Rock 'n' Roll High School
 The Riffs, a gang in the film The Warriors

Music
 Riff (American band), a 1980s/1990s rhythm and blues vocal group
 Riff (Argentine band) a hard rock band
 Riffs (Status Quo album), 2003
 Riffs (Jimmy Lyons album)
 "The Riff" (Lordi song), 2013
 The Riffs, American band
 "Riff", a song by Sander van Doorn from Supernaturalistic
 "The Riff Song", a musical number from The Desert Song

Other uses
 Resource Interchange File Format (RIFF), a generic file container format
 The Riff, an Australian music video television show
 Riff: Everyday Shooter, a 2007 video game
 Penrith, New South Wales, Australia, nicknamed "The Riff"
 MSTing or riffing, a form of humorous media commentary
 WRIF, "The Riff", a radio station in Detroit, Michigan, US

See also
 RIF (disambiguation)
 Rif, a region of Morocco
 Riffian people, a Berber people of the Rif